FanMail is the third studio album by American girl group TLC, released on February 23, 1999, by LaFace and Arista Records. The album title is a tribute to TLC's fans who sent them fan mail during their hiatus. FanMail debuted at number one on the US Billboard 200, selling 318,000 copies in its first week of release, and spent five weeks at number one.

The album received eight nominations at the 42nd Annual Grammy Awards, including one for Album of the Year, winning three. It has been certified six-times platinum by the Recording Industry Association of America (RIAA), and has sold 10 million copies worldwide. FanMail is TLC's second-best-selling album after their 1994 studio album CrazySexyCool. To promote the album, TLC embarked on their first concert tour titled the FanMail Tour. It was the group's final album released in Lisa "Left Eye" Lopes' lifetime before she died on April 25, 2002, as she was killed in a car crash prior to the release of their fourth studio album 3D (2002).

Background
After filing for Chapter 11 bankruptcy on July 3, 1995, the group went on a recording hiatus. The suit was eventually settled on November 25, 1996. Preliminary work on their third studio album was delayed when friction arose between the group and their main producer Dallas Austin, who was at the time dating member Rozonda "Chilli" Thomas, and helped to raise their son Tron. Austin wanted $4.2 million and creative control on the project, resulting in a stand-off between him and the group. TLC eventually entered recording studios in April 1998 to start work on their then-untitled third album with Austin, who returned with a handshake agreement. While he contributed the most to the album and served as the executive producer, they also collaborated with long-term producers Babyface and L.A. Reid, as well as with Kevin "She'kspere" Briggs, Jimmy Jam and Terry Lewis. FanMail was initially scheduled for release on November 10, 1998, but was delayed to the first quarter of 1999.

Meanwhile, Lisa "Left Eye" Lopes wrote and composed eight songs for the album, all of which Austin rejected, stating that they were "inferior" since she had never written a song before. Consequently, Lopes told MTV News in July 1998 that she decided to work on a solo album assisted by Erick Sermon, which was planned to be released before FanMail, further causing tension among the group. During an interview with Vibe in 1999, Lopes publicly derided her involvement in TLC:I've graduated from this era. I cannot stand 100 percent behind this TLC project and the music that is supposed to represent me. This will be my last interview until I can speak freely about the truth and present myself on my solo project.

Recording and production
During the recording of FanMail, the group were offered many songs that would eventually be recorded by other artists such as 702's "Where My Girls At?" (1999), Whitney Houston's "Heartbreak Hotel" (1998), and Britney Spears' "...Baby One More Time" (1998). Thomas stated that the group considered recording each track but were worried that it did not represent them well. Tionne "T-Boz" Watkins reiterated Thomas' reasoning in an interview with MTV News, stating that "...Baby One More Time" was not good for them despite appreciating and respecting Spears' decision to record it.

Watkins decided to begin writing poetry to deal with her emotions after being in and out of hospital due to sickle cell disease. She took her collection of poems to Austin, who helped her adapt one into the song "Unpretty", while another was adapted by Babyface into "Dear Lie". While writing and recording "I'm Good at Being Bad" in Minneapolis, Watkins had been inspired by grunge band Nirvana's loud and soft dynamic shifts in their discography, and wanted to create a song in a similar style for TLC. Jam encouraged her to hum the melody while he played the beat in the recording booth, which was unlike her usual process of listening to the beat and writing out the lyrics. She stated that the technique influenced her as a songwriter. She sought to have Lopes rap the pre-chorus herself, but Lopes insisted that Watkins' thicker voice should be used for the track. Watkins also contributed to writing two more songs for the album, co-writing "If They Knew" and "Shout" with Austin and Lopes. Two of the album's tracks, "Come on Down" and "I Miss You So Much", were originally written for Watkins to sing lead. However, she decided that Thomas would be more suited as the lead vocalist after attempting to record them. During the recording of the latter, Thomas was suffering from a sinus infection. She asked to re-record the song the next week despite it being near the album's deadline, but Babyface decided that the vocal take she had recorded would be suitable for the final version. "No Scrubs" was one of the final tracks recorded for the album. It was originally written by Kandi Burruss, Tameka Cottle, and Briggs for the former two artists to record together as part of the girl group Xscape. However, Austin persuaded Briggs to give the song to TLC as their first single for FanMail, with Thomas singing the lead vocals. Austin further emphasized that it was a breakthrough for her, as he believed that she was more capable than being relegated to a secondary vocalist.

Composition
FanMail took on a new, futuristic style, due to the rapid advancement in technology heading into the new millennium such as the Y2K bug and Napster. This was effectively portrayed in the album's most popular song "No Scrubs" along with the music video, which embraces a modern emphasis on female strength and independence. The album contains several tracks featuring vocals by the computer modulated voice Vic-E, a talking android which is reminiscent of the "tour guide" on A Tribe Called Quest's 1993 studio album, Midnight Marauders. Initially, the android was created through the Macintosh's greeting voice as a replacement for Lopes, as she refused to work with the group. However, once she reconciled with them, she approved of the android and decided to include it on the album as a character.

FanMail is an R&B and urban soul album, which includes tracks featuring funk, hip hop-inspired dance-pop, and ballads. Several producers were involved in the album's production, including Dallas Austin, Babyface, Jermaine Dupri, Jimmy Jam, and Terry Lewis. Throughout 17 tracks, TLC brought up issues of sexuality, insecurities, self-reliance, and vulnerability with resistant messaging. It fused elements of "new jill swing" and sounds created from a Roland TR-808, to form a "cyber-R&B masterpiece". On the first track "FanMail", Austin used multiple samples from the internet and movies in order to create a "space sound" that "will sound like what the album cover looks like". The background noise consisting of typewriters and printers was incorporated to represent the fan letters and fan mail, while Austin added a sample from an interview with Lopes commenting "all these conflicting fan mail", and created a hook with it. The song consisted of a sneaking bassline, vocal stutters, and glitches similar to that of dial-up Internet. However, in contrast to the album's dominating technological sound, "Unpretty" is an alternative pop song that describes the insecurity caused by body-shaming. The song was inspired by a poem written by Watkins. "Communicate (Interlude)" establishes the connection between the thoughts and feelings of people nearby through technology. The lyrics from the song, "There's over a thousand ways/ To communicate in our world today/ And it's a shame/ That we don't connect" describe the lack of interaction between humans, which in turn has increased the rate of depression among adolescents. It combines the typing of a keyboard in the background with Left Eye's vocals, "will you communicate with me?".

Artwork, packaging, and title
The FanMail cover featured a custom font design, and cover art with decode-able binary code which included images of the TLC members in metallic skin tones. The photographer, Dan Levy, shot the silver-painted group members without any digital alterations. Writing for i-D, Annie Lord described the members on the cover as "three digitised, disembodied cyborgs from another dimension", and compared the binary code across their faces to The Matrix. The CD insert folds out to form a large poster featuring a picture of the three TLC members and the names of thousands of people who sent them fan mail throughout their career. A limited edition of the album was released, which had an insert with a lenticular version of the cover placed in front of the original booklet in the jewel case.

The album title is a tribute to TLC's fans after their five-year hiatus. It came from Lopes, who also coined the group's first two album titles Ooooooohhh... On the TLC Tip and CrazySexyCool, and initially wanted to name the album Fan2See. She stated to the group, "let's write and sing one big fan letter. Let's put fan names on everything – all the singles, the album cover, T-shirts, mugs. Just show our appreciation".

Promotion

Singles
"FanMail", "Silly Ho", "I'm Good at Being Bad", and "My Life" served as promotional singles for the album. Those songs charted on the US Billboard R&B/Hip-Hop Songs.

"No Scrubs" was the official lead single and topped the US Billboard Hot 100 for four consecutive weeks, becoming TLC's biggest commercial success in years. It also ranked at number two on [[Billboard Year-End Hot 100 singles of 1999|Billboards Year-End Hot 100 of 1999]].

Follow-up single "Unpretty" also topped the Billboard Hot 100, spending three weeks at number one and placing at number 20 on the Year-End Hot 100.

Originally, "Shout" was planned to be a single in the United States, while "Dear Lie" would be a single internationally, but only the latter would end up being released as a single with an accompanying music video. It peaked at number 51 on the Billboard Hot 100.

Tour

TLC embarked on the FanMail Tour to promote the album. It was their first headlining tour, and their first tour in five years. As part of a sponsorship with MP3.com, the group released "I Need That", with proceeds sent to the Sickle Cell Disease Association of America. The song was described by the producer Rico Lumpkins as "more R&B than hip-hop". The stage and costumes were all designed by each TLC member. The FanMail Tour became the highest-grossing tour by a girl group, as it grossed over $72.8 million. It was the final tour with all three members together.

Critical reception

Writing for Muzik, Tony Farsides stated that FanMail was "a real grower" in comparison to other albums released during the time. NME writer Roger Morton compared the album's "cyber concept" to Prince's electronic funk discography and opined that TLC were not diminished by other girl groups such as Honeyz, All Saints, and the Spice Girls.

Ann Powers of Rolling Stone opined that elements of FanMail were "fragmented" despite sounding more "sharper [and] aggressive" than CrazySexyCool, but praised the TLC members for taking "brave" risks. Writing for AllMusic, Stephen Thomas Erlewine noted that the group were attempting to imitate the production of CrazySexyCool although he noted the album's versatility. Los Angeles Times staff writer Marc Weingarten negatively stated that the vocals were "wispy [and] flat", and that all members were "severely limited singers". However, he commented that the album's production managed to overpower their vocals with "sinewy beats and startling arrangements".

David Browne of Entertainment Weekly criticized TLC's "startlingly faceless and homogeneous" vocals and opined that FanMail was an "endless parade of hooks" without the essence of R&B. He acknowledged that their vocals were typical of some R&B artists in the 1990s who "warble in the same half-asleep murmur" and lamented that the genre is "curiously dispassionate". Writing for Spin, Joshua Clover stated that the album was "a burning, physical message that looks like a spectacle but reads like sexual politics" and criticized the producers for attempting to resemble Timbaland's production.

Commercial performance
In the United States, FanMail debuted at number one on the Billboard 200 and the Top R&B/Hip-Hop Albums charts with 318,000 copies sold in its first week, becoming TLC's first number-one album on both charts. On June 21, 2000, it was certified six-times platinum by the Recording Industry Association of America (RIAA). According to Nielsen SoundScan, the album had sold 4.8 million copies in the United States as of July 2017; it had sold an additional 877,000 copies through the BMG Music Club as of February 2003. Internationally, the album reached the top 10 in New Zealand, Canada, and the United Kingdom. As of February 2019, FanMail has sold over 10 million copies worldwide.

Track listing

Digital download track
 "I Need That" – 3:52
 Released online by TLC exclusively on MP3.com to promote the FanMail Tour. Produced by Rico Lumpkins for PWPX, LLC. Written by R. Lumpkins, L. Lopes, and S. Chunn. Left Eye's rap was later expanded and re-recorded on the track "Gimme Some" from Toni Braxton's album The Heat, as well as being completely reused and shortened on the track "Whoop De Woo" from the compilation Now and Forever: The Hits, originally intended for the group's fourth album 3D.Notes  signifies a co-producer
  signifies an additional vocal producerSample credits'''
 "FanMail" contains an excerpt from an MTV interview that features the instrumental of TLC's song Diggin' on You in the background.
 "I'm Good at Being Bad" contains elements from "Slippin' into Darkness" by War. The song also originally contained interpolated lyrics from "Love to Love You Baby" by Donna Summer, but the interpolated lyrics were later removed on later pressings of the explicit version.
 On initial pressings of the album, "Whispering Playa – Interlude" contained a sample of "Cold Blooded" by Rick James playing in the background. The sample was removed on subsequent editions, with TLC's song "U in Me" being played in the background instead.
 "Automatic" contains portions from Neil Armstrong's "Moon Landing" speech.

Personnel
Credits adapted from the liner notes of FanMail''.

Musicians

 Dallas Austin – arrangements ; gang vocals 
 T-Boz – background vocals ; gang vocals 
 Chilli – background vocals 
 Debra Killings – background vocals ; bass 
 Rick Sheppard – MIDI, sound design 
 Vic-E – speech ; rap 
 Leslie Brathwaite – gang vocals 
 Ty Hudson – gang vocals 
 Joi Gilliam – gang vocals 
 Peach – gang vocals 
 Sonji – gang vocals 
 Carolyn Paige – gang vocals 
 Kevin Wales – gang vocals 
 "Big" Stan Smith – gang vocals 
 Papi – playa 
 Kandi Burruss – background vocals 
 Tameka "Tiny" Cottle – background vocals 
 She'kspere – MIDI, sound design 
 Jimmy Jam and Terry Lewis – arrangements, all other musical instruments 
 Mike Scott – guitar 
 Alex Richbourg – drum programming 
 Jerry Lumpkins – additional keyboards 
 Babyface – drum programming, acoustic guitar ; keyboards, electric guitar 
 Greg Phillinganes – piano ; Wurlitzer 
 Michael Thompson – acoustic guitar ; electric guitar 
 C.C. Thomas – bass 
 Necia Bray – background vocals 
 Tomi Martin – guitar 
 Tom Knight – drums 
 LaMarquis Jefferson – bass 
 Marde Johnson – gang vocals 
 Koko Watkins – gang vocals 
 Solomon Jackson – gang vocals 
 James Killings – guitar 
 Nathan East – bass 
 Paulinho da Costa – percussion 
 Colin Wolfe – bass 
 Melvin M. Jones – trumpet 
 Gregory Hudspeth – saxophone 
 Anthony Roberson – trombone

Technical

 Cyptron – production 
 Carlton Lynn – recording ; recording assistance ; mixing 
 Leslie Brathwaite – recording ; mixing 
 Jeff Griffin – recording assistance 
 Sejoon Kahng – recording assistance 
 Alvin Speights – mixing 
 Vernon J. Mungo – mixing assistance ; recording assistance ; recording 
 Ty Hudson – recording assistance ; mixing assistance 
 Dallas Austin – production ; executive production
 Kevin "She'kspere" Briggs – production ; additional vocal production 
 Jimmy Jam and Terry Lewis – production 
 Steve Hodge – recording, mixing 
 Xavier Smith – recording assistance, mixing assistance 
 Dave Rideau – vocal recording 
 Gordon Fordyce – vocal recording assistance 
 Dylan Dresdow – vocal recording assistance  
 Ricciano Lumpkins – production ; recording 
 John Horesco IV – mixing assistance ; digital editing 
 Babyface – production ; executive production
 Daryl Simmons – production 
 Paul Boutin – recording 
 Thom "TK" Kidd – lead vocals recording 
 Kevin Lively – lead vocals recording assistance ; mixing assistance 
 Ralph Cacciurri – lead vocals recording assistance 
 Jon Gass – mixing 
 Ivy Skoff – production coordination 
 Jermaine Dupri – production, mixing 
 Carl So-Lowe – co-production 
 Brian Frye – recording 
 Phil Tan – mixing 
 Diane Makowski – production coordination 
 Debra Killings – production 
 Aman Junaid – recording 
 E'lyk – mixing assistance 
 Claudine Pontier – recording assistance 
 Herb Powers Jr. – mastering
 Antonio M. Reid – executive production
 TLC – executive production

Artwork
 TLC – creative concept
 D.L. Warfield – art direction, design
 Cherie O'Brien – creative coordination
 Nigel Sawyer – layout assistance
 Seb Janiak – photography

Charts

Weekly charts

Year-end charts

Decade-end charts

Certifications and sales

See also
 List of Billboard 200 number-one albums of 1999
 List of Billboard number-one R&B albums of 1999

Notes

References

1999 albums
Albums produced by Babyface (musician)
Albums produced by Dallas Austin
Albums produced by Jermaine Dupri
Albums produced by Jimmy Jam and Terry Lewis
Arista Records albums
Grammy Award for Best R&B Album
LaFace Records albums
TLC (group) albums